A Brown Betty is a traditional American dessert made from fruit (usually apple, but also berries or pears) and sweetened crumbs. Similar to a cobbler or apple crisp, the fruit is baked, and, in this case, the sweetened crumbs are placed in layers between the fruit. It is usually served with lemon sauce or whipped cream.

The dish was first mentioned in print in 1864. A recipe from 1877 uses apple sauce and cracker crumbs.

Apple Brown Betty was one of the favorite desserts of Ronald and Nancy Reagan in the White House.

See also
 Cobbler (food)
 Crumble
 Apple crisp
 List of apple dishes

References

External links
 Apple Brown Betty recipe

American desserts
Puddings
19th-century food
Apple dishes